Morgantown Municipal Airport  is three miles east of Morgantown, in Monongalia County, West Virginia. It is also known as Walter L. Bill Hart Field. It sees one passenger airline, Southern Airways Express, subsidized by the Essential Air Service program.

The FAA's National Plan of Integrated Airport Systems for 2021–2025 categorized it as a primary commercial service airport (more than 10,000 enplanements per year).

The airport's runway cannot handle larger airplanes, but it has filed a request with the Federal Aviation Administration to lengthen the runway.

Facilities
The airport covers 494 acres (200 ha) at an elevation of 1,244 feet (379 m) above sea level. Its single runway, 18/36, is 5,199 by 150 feet (1,585 x 46 m).

In the year ending December 31, 2019, the airport had 55,660 aircraft operations, an average of 152 per day: 54% general aviation, 42% air taxi and 4% military. In April 2022, there were 30 aircraft based at this airport: 25 single-engine, 4 multi-engine and 1 jet.

History

The first passenger airline flights were Capital DC-3s in 1949; Lake Central replaced Capital in 1961, and successor Allegheny was replaced by Allegheny Commuter in 1979. Air Midwest flew between Morgantown and Pittsburgh until 2005. Mesa Airlines also operated flights between Morgantown and Pittsburgh under the US Airways Express name from 1996 to 2005.

RegionsAir flew as Continental Connection between Morgantown and Cleveland from 2005 to March 2007. Colgan Air flew as US Airways Express between Morgantown and Pittsburgh from May 2007 to January 2008. In January 2008 a $1.9 million federal grant was awarded for an access road between the airport and Interstate 68. Colgan Air flew as United Express between Morgantown and Washington–Dulles beginning in January 2008. These flights ended in May 2012.

Silver Airways flew from Morgantown Municipal Airport to Clarksburg and Washington–Dulles. In June 2016, City of Morgantown employees began looking at other air carriers to replace Silver Airways because of Silver Airways' increasingly poor reliability. Airport officials received proposals from five interested airlines, namely Silver Airways, Southern Airways Express, ViaAir, Boutique Air, and Corporate Flight Management. Airport officials recommended that Southern Airways Express be chosen for the next Essential Air Service contract to service the airport primarily because of the air carrier's 99.2 percent completion rate, which was higher than Silver Airways' rate that had sometimes been less than 70 percent.

Starting on November 30, 2016, Southern Airways Express began flights between Morgantown Municipal Airport and both Pittsburgh International Airport and Washington Dulles International Airport. Pittsburgh was chosen as a destination because many people of Morgantown were used to flying out of Pittsburgh and enduring the lengthy drive, parking costs, and long lines at airport security. Southern Airways Express continued previous service to Washington–Dulles for the use of business travel and international travel pertaining to West Virginia University.

On July 31, 2017 Southern Airways Express ended service to Washington Dulles and began service to Baltimore–Washington International Airport. Connections to many low-cost carriers were seen as a positive improvements, as was the adjacent rail station that provides access to Washington Union Station near the United States Capitol. The airline reversed course in August 2021 returning service to Washington Dulles.

Airline and destinations

Passenger

Statistics

References

Other sources

 Essential Air Service documents (Docket DOT-OST-2005-20735) from the U.S. Department of Transportation:
 Notice (March 22, 2005): of Air Midwest, Inc. of its intent to discontinue scheduled non-subsidized Essential Air Service between Morgantown, West Virginia and Pittsburgh, Pennsylvania, effective June 20, 2005.
 Order 2005-4-19 (April 19, 2005): prohibiting Air Midwest, Inc., from terminating its unsubsidized, scheduled air service at Parkersburg, Morgantown and Clarksburg/Fairmont, West Virginia, beyond the end of its 90-day notice periods, and requesting proposals from carriers interested in providing replacement essential air service (EAS) at the communities, with or without subsidy.
 Order 2005-9-8 (September 9, 2005): selecting RegionsAir, Inc. to provide subsidized essential air Service (EAS) at Parkersburg, Morgantown and Clarksburg/Fairmont, West Virginia for a two-year period and establishing a combined subsidy rate of $1,051,333 per year for service consisting of 18 nonstop round trips each week between Parkersburg and Cincinnati, and 18 round trips to Cincinnati each week over a MGW-CKB-CVG-CKB-MGW routing, with 34-seat Saab 340A aircraft.
 Order 2007-1-16 (January 25, 2007): selecting Colgan Air, Inc. d/b/a US Airways Express to provide subsidized essential air service (EAS) at Parkersburg, Morgantown, and Clarksburg/Fairmont, West Virginia, for two years, beginning when the carrier inaugurates service. Each community will receive 19 weekly round trips to Pittsburgh with 34-passenger Saab 340 aircraft. Service from Parkersburg will be nonstop in each direction. Service from Morgantown and Clarksburg/Fairmont will be served with a Pittsburgh - Morgantown - Clarksburg - Pittsburgh or a Pittsburgh - Clarksburg - Morgantown - Pittsburgh routing. The total combined annual subsidy is $2,421,914.
 Ninety-Day Notice (March 28, 2008): of intent of Colgan Air Inc. D/B/A United Express to terminate scheduled essential air service at Parkersburg, Morgantown and Clarksburg/Fairmont, WV, effective June 28, 2008.
 Order 2008-5-37 (May 27, 2008): re-selecting Colgan Air, Inc. d/b/a United Express, to provide subsidized essential air service (EAS) at Morgantown and Clarksburg/Fairmont, West Virginia, at a total annual subsidy rate of $2,116,650, for the two-year period of June 1, 2008, through May 31, 2010,
 Order 2010-6-25 (June 29, 2010): re-selecting Colgan Air, Inc. to provide essential air service (EAS) at Clarksburg/Fairmont and Morgantown, WV, for a combined annual subsidy of $2,976,438, and at Beckley, WV, for an annual subsidy of $2,313, 457, for the two-year period from August 1, 2010, through July 31, 2012. Also selecting Gulfstream International Airlines, Inc., to provide EAS at Parkersburg, WV/Marietta, OH, at an annual subsidy rate of $2,642,237, for a two-year period beginning when the carrier inaugurates full EAS through the end of the 24th month thereafter. The total annual subsidy for all four communities is $7,923,132.
 Order 2012-4-32 (April 30, 2012): selecting Silver Airways to provide Essential Air Service (EAS) at Beckley, Clarksburg/Fairmont ("Clarksburg") and Morgantown, West Virginia, for a combined annual subsidy of $5,968,744 ($2,512,494 for Beckley; $3,456,250 for Clarksburg and Morgantown), for the two-year period beginning when the carrier begins full EAS at all three communities.

External links
 Morgantown Municipal Airport, official web site
 Morgantown Municipal Airport from 2008 West Virginia DOT Airport Directory
 Aerial image as of June 1988 from USGS The National Map
 
 
 

Airports in West Virginia
Essential Air Service
Transportation in Monongalia County, West Virginia
Buildings and structures in Monongalia County, West Virginia